Howery is a surname. Notable people with the surname include: 

Ken Howery (born 1975), American entrepreneur and diplomat
Lil Rel Howery (born 1979), American actor and comedian